The following units and commanders fought in the Swatow Operation, June 21–27, 1939, of the Second Sino-Japanese War.

Japan

Imperial Japanese Navy
5th Fleet - Vice Admiral Kondo Nobutake [2]
 5th Destroyer Sentai
 12th Minesweeper Unit
 21st Minesweeper Unit
 45th Destroyer Unit
 Chiyoda (carrier) -
 3rd Combined Air Unit
 Canton Air Unit
 Sasebo 9th SNLF
Goto Detachment - Major Gen. Jūrō Gotō [2]
 132nd Infantry Brigade
 137th Infantry Regiment
 161st Infantry Regiment
 70th Independent Infantry Battalion
 2 Mountain Gun Batteries
 2 engineer companies
 Tankette platoon
 Rivercrossing material company

Airforces:
IJN airforces from: [2]
 Chiyoda -
 3rd Combined Air Unit
 Canton Air Unit

Notes: 
 Goto Detachment was built around the 132nd Infantry Brigade detached from 104th Division from 21st Army in Canton, in South China.
 5th Fleet Naval force strength: *[1]
 40+ ships
 10+ motorboats

China

Local defenders:
 #? Brigade - Hua Chen-chung
 Local Militia - ?
 2nd Peace Preservation Regiment
 4th Peace Preservation Regiment
 5th Peace Preservation Regiment
 Training Regiment

Later reinforcements:
 5th Reserve Division - ?
 1st Advance Column - ?

Sources 
Hsu Long-hsuen and Chang Ming-kai, History of The Sino-Japanese War (1937–1945) 2nd Ed.,1971. Translated by Wen Ha-hsiung, Chung Wu Publishing; 33, 140th Lane, Tung-hwa Street, Taipei, Taiwan Republic of China.  Pg. 492–493.
 The Japanese OOB of Swatow Operation

Battles of the Second Sino-Japanese War
Second Sino-Japanese War orders of battle
Conflicts in 1939